Adam Chandler is a fictional character from the ABC and The Online Network daytime drama All My Children, portrayed by David Canary from the autumn of 1983 through his departure on April 23, 2010, and briefly reprising the role for the series' final weeks on ABC in September 2011. Canary also appeared several different times on One Life to Live. Adam Chandler was one of the most devious and powerful individuals within the town of Pine Valley, Pennsylvania. He is a member of the powerful and wealthy Chandler family, residing at the Chandler Mansion (300 River Road).

Adam has been one of Pine Valley's most frequently married characters, but his most significant relationships have been with his sunny-natured autistic twin Stuart, and his long-time business rival Palmer Cortlandt; although the feud quieted down when Palmer's appearances within the show significantly decreased.

Five of Adam's eight children have survived into adulthood; Skye Chandler Quartermaine, Hayley Vaughan Santos, JR Chandler, Miguel Reyes, and Colby Chandler. Through them, he has three grandchildren; Lila Rae Alcazar (Skye's daughter), Enzo Santos (Hayley's son), and AJ Chandler (JR's son). Alcoholism seems to run in the Chandler family, affecting Skye, Hayley and JR; Colby briefly followed the same path. His son JR was estranged from Adam because of his marriage to Annie Novak, and he started an affair with Annie to break up his father's marriage. This led to Adam Chandler leaving Pine Valley permanently (it is believed) in April 2010, to be with former wife Brooke English. After leaving town, Adam had his attorney and another ex-wife, Liza, serve Annie divorce papers.

Recognized beyond fiction, Adam has been cited by scholars as one of the "most powerful male figures in television," as well as one of its most complex villains, said to "combine ruthlessness in business and love with wit and sometimes true tenderness."

Notes and references

Further reading

External links
Adam Chandler's Character Bio from ABC.com
 Adam Chandler from soapcentral.com
Adam Chandler at All My Children Blog

All My Children characters
Fictional criminals in soap operas
Fictional bartenders
Fictional business executives
Fictional socialites
Male villains
American male characters in television
Television characters introduced in 1983
Fictional characters from West Virginia
Fictional identical twins
Fictional twins
Fictional businesspeople
Crossover characters in television